Hardware LDN is a London-based and owned fashion house that specializes in high-end clothing, accessories and outerwear.
Founded by Jessica Horwell in 2012, her initial designs immediately attracted a large celebrity following (Cara Delevigne, Bella Hadid, Madison Beer) which has been growing ever since. 
Spending time in both New York and Los Angeles as well as her home town of London has led to the Hardware LDN range being stocked in Selfridges.

History 
Jessica Horwell is a self-taught fashion designer who started by creating jewellery out of items found at hardware stores.

After a short stint as a stylist for the likes of Rihanna, Tinie Tempah and Eliza Doolittle, Jessica wanted to return to the more creative side of design and expand her collection from jewellery to clothes and other accessories and in doing so returned to her previous work for inspiration when naming the brand Hardware LDN.

Jessica was selected to be one of three emerging fashion designers to take part in an Air Force one global campaign event, celebrating 35 years of one of Nike most iconic styles. 
Tapping into the Hardware LDN aesthetic, Jessica hand embellished 3 separate Air Force 1 styles, then to launch the shoes she curated
and hosted an interactive workshop at the Nike flagship store in L.A. 
This hands-on approach is rooted in the DNA of Hardware LDN and reflects the
approach Jessica takes when producing her collections.

For FW20 Hardware LDN made its on schedule NYC Fashion week debut.
The culmination of years of travel across the Atlantic and hard work had led to this moment.

Influences 

Horwell draws on a wide range of influences for her designs. Most notably these include London, NYC and L.A. She describes the brand as "bold, edgy, provocative, fun, London" and wants to "create a lifestyle brand with a strong identity".

Horwell has strong connections with the music industry through her styling and creative direction work. Hardware LDN has been seen on Artists such as Wiz Khalifa, Halsey, Wu-tang and Mac Miller, and in summer 2015 provided the clothing for all the backing dancers for Rita Ora's UK summer tour.

References

External links 
 

British companies established in 2012
Clothing companies of England
Clothing retailers of England